Harry Lee (born 22 December 2004) is an English professional footballer who plays as a goalkeeper for  club Exeter City.

Early and personal life
Lee is a Torquay United fan and season ticket holder; he attended Torquay Academy.

Playing career
Lee joined Exeter City when Torquay United closed their academy in 2015. He was named on the Exeter City substitute bench in EFL League Two fixtures during the 2020–21 season at the age of just 15. He turned professional at the club in summer 2021. He made his first-team debut in the EFL Trophy, in a 1–1 draw with Chelsea U21 at St James Park. He saved two penalties in a shoot-out victory over Cheltenham Town in the next EFL Trophy game. Manager Matt Taylor said he would look to let Lee go out on loan into non-League as it was a "big ask" to expect a 16-year old to play in the English Football League. He joined Southern League Premier Division South side Dorchester Town on a one-month loan deal starting on 22 October, after regular custodian Gerard Benfield dislocated his fingers., however Lee was recalled soon after to become Exeter’s back-up goalkeeper after the departure of Scott Brown to Rotherham United. Lee made his EFL league debut on the 25 October 2022 as an 88th minute substitute against Derby County due to an injury picked up by Exeter’s regular goalkeeper Jamal Blackman.

Statistics

References

2004 births
Living people
English footballers
Association football goalkeepers
Torquay United F.C. players
Exeter City F.C. players
Dorchester Town F.C. players
English Football League players
Southern Football League players